Boonpak Kwancharoen (born 9 April 1928) is/was a Thai science teacher and author. He taught at the Demonstration School of Bansomdejchaopraya Rajabhat University, and wrote the 1970 book Nak Witthayasat Num ( 'young scientists'), which was included on the list of 88 recommended Thai science books sponsored by the Thailand Research Fund in 2001. As a middle-distance runner, he competed in the men's 800 metres at the 1952 Summer Olympics.

References

External links
 

1928 births
Possibly living people
Boonpak Kwancharoen
Boonpak Kwancharoen
Athletes (track and field) at the 1952 Summer Olympics
Boonpak Kwancharoen
Boonpak Kwancharoen
Place of birth missing (living people)